Abbas Razavi Kashani (Persian: عباس رضوي) is a retired Iranian Footballer and one of the most experienced football coaches in Iran. He has coaching experience in Iran, Hungary, UAE, Sweden and Italy.

Playing career
He played football at youth level with Afsar F.C. which was Taj F.C.'s youth team as well as Javanan Eqbal.

At senior level he played for Eqbal F.C. and he retired at age of 26.

Managerial career

He got his coaching license at age of 26. Then he went on and coached several Iranian clubs Eqbal F.C., Bargh Shiraz F.C., F.C. Aboomoslem and Esteghlal F.C. throughout the 1960s and 1970s.

Throughout the 1980s he was involved with youth football development mainly working at U16 and U20 levels, with Iran national youth teams and Vasas SC. As assistant coach, he has worked with several famous coaches such as Rudolf Illovszky, Kálmán Mészöly, Heshmat Mohajerani.
As head coach throughout the 1990s to present, he has coached several clubs in Swedish First and Second Division and most recently a short spell with Rahahan F.C. back in 2006.

Achievements
Champion:  Tehran Hazfi Cup with Esteghlal F.C.
Champion:  Hungarian League with Vasas SC
Champion:  Swedish Second Division

References

External links
 Abbas Razavi profile
 گفتگو با روزنامه ایران ‌ورزشی
09/2013

Iranian football managers
Iranian footballers
Esteghlal F.C. managers
Living people
1944 births
Association footballers not categorized by position
Bargh Shiraz F.C. managers